Jerusalem bagel (In ; in ) is a type of bread baked in Jerusalem.  It has a ring shape but is otherwise unlike a traditional boiled bagel. 

It is derived from the ka'ak bread ring which is found throughout the Middle East.  Typically, this is a yeasted, crusty bread which is shaped into an oblong ring and covered in sesame seeds.  The dough has a lighter texture than a traditional bagel. It can be sliced and served with various toppings.

See also 

 Bagel
 Bread
 Breakfast

References

Bagels
Israeli cuisine
Jewish cuisine
Seeded breads
Street food